Conflux may refer to: 

Conflux AB, The heating company
Confluence, the meeting of two or more bodies of water
Conflux (album), 2002 album by Serbin band Draconic 
Psy-Geo-Conflux, New York City festival
Conflux (Magic: The Gathering), a Magic: The Gathering expansion set that is part of the Alara block